The 2018 Dudley Hewitt Cup was the 47th Central Canadian Jr A Ice Hockey Championship for the Canadian Junior Hockey League. The winner of the 2018 Dudley Hewitt Cup represented the central region in the 2018 Royal Bank Cup in Chilliwack, BC.

Teams
Dryden Ice Dogs (SIJHL Champions)
Regular Season: 40-8-6-2 (1st in SIJHL)
Playoffs: Defeated Fort Frances Lakers 4-1, Defeated Thunder Bay North Stars 4-2 to win the league.

Thunder Bay North Stars (SIJHL Runner-up)
Regular Season: 38-13-4-1 (3rd in SIJHL)
Playoffs: Defeated Minnesota Iron Rangers 3-0, Defeated Thief River Falls Norskies 4-1, Lost to Dryden Ice Dogs 2-4.

Wellington Dukes (OJHL Champions)
Regular Season: 33-13-3-5 (1st in OJHL East Division)
Playoffs: Defeated Pickering Panthers 4-3, Defeated Newmarket Hurricanes 4-3, Defeated Aurora Tigers 4-1, Defeated Georgetown Raiders 4-2 to win the league.

Cochrane Crunch (NOJHL Champions)
Regular Season: 36-17-2-1 (2nd in NOJHL East Division)
Playoffs: Defeated Kirkland Lake Gold Miners 4-1, Defeated Timmins Rock 4-1, Defeated Rayside-Balfour Canadians 4-2 to win the league.

Round Robin

Tie Breaker: Head-to-Head, then 3-way +/-.

Results

Semifinals and final

References
http://www.centralcanadianchampionship.com/view/dudleyhewitt
http://pointstreaksites.com/view/ojhl
https://nojhl.com/
https://sijhlhockey.com/

2017–18 in Canadian ice hockey